The Towerlands Tram Road was a 19th-century mineral railway or 'Bogey line' that transported coal, running from the old Towerlands Colliery and associated coal pits near Bourtreehill to Irvine in one direction and to Dreghorn in the other direction. Both towns are located in North Ayrshire, Scotland.

History

The term 'Tram Road' is indicated on OS maps, and the course of the line mainly follows a route defined by the roads that existed at the time from the Towerlands or Tourlands coal pits and the later colliery in two directions, one separate branch line running to Dreghorn railway station where exchange sidings existed for transport further afield via the standard gauge Glasgow and South Western Railway's Dalry to Kilmarnock line and the other branch running to the outskirts of Irvine at Townhead, the tram road ending just short of Springfield House on Mill Road, once called Slate Mill Road.

The Great Reform Act Plans and Reports map of 1832 does not show the tram road that first appears in the 1856 OS maps. The Towerlands Colliery at Dreghorn had closed by 1878, and the OS map of 1890 only names and indicates the route of the tram road without marking the colliery or the tram road tracks. Later OS maps mark the old colliery 'offices' as Towerlands Cottage.

In keeping with other such tram roads the line was probably worked by gravity, manually and by horses. The use of horses is also indicated by the horse trough next to the line near Fencedyke. The use of steam locomotives is not consistent with the tram road's infrastructure as indicated on the OS maps, with right angle bends, gaps at road junctions, etc., although the short section of line to Dreghorn was different in this respect, and a locomotive-style run-round loop is suggestive of some form of steam engine being in use here.

A 'tram' in historical terms was a low box-shaped four-wheeled cart or barrow used in coal mines, often without a flange on its wheels that were either wood with metal tyres or made from metal. A 'tram road' was a roadway built to permit the passage of trams or waggons and consists of parallel tracks made of metal plates or rails, carved stone blocks or wooden rails, often with metal traction surface strips attached. Tramroads often run on roads that are also used by cars, pedestrians, etc.

One branch of the Towerlands Tram Road appears to have been relatively cheaply constructed to supply coal to the population of Irvine and to the Town Mill using horse drawn waggons or trams that used dedicated sections of tram road along the edge of the existing road in places, with a few diversions through fields where necessary. The horse-drawn waggons may have been able to continue and complete their journey into Irvine by road, and as noted a weighing machine was present at Townhead near the toll.

The Dreghorn branch is not shown as being physically joined to the Irvine branch. The presence of a run-round loop and a siding at Towerlands Colliery may be suggestive of the use of a steam locomotive, which would require a heavier gauge of track. This section of the line was built for the export of coal via the exchange sidings located at Dreghorn railway station as shown on the 1856 OS map.

Associated infrastructure
The surfacing of the early 19th century roads outside of the town that were not surfaced with cobblestones would not have been sufficient to resist the wear and tear from a regular movement of heavy coal waggons, which may explain why the tram road was built and why it stopped close to the cobbled streets of Irvine town centre.

It is not known what sort of sleepers were used; however, stone blocks were favoured on horse-worked lines, as they did not interfere with the centre of the track as do wooden sleepers that run right across the centre of the trackbed.

The Ordnance Survey maps show that weighing machines existed at both the colliery and at the Townhead turnpike in Irvine.

The tram road gauge is not known, but the OS map depiction suggests that standard gauge of 4 ft 8.5 in. was in use on the Dreghorn section at least, as the Towerlands Colliery tram road ran on to standard gauge railway exchange sidings at Dreghorn railway station.

The route was not entirely fenced, such as at the 'on road' section running past Bourtreehill down to the Irvine municipal boundary where the fencing started and then continued down to the terminus near Springfield House.

Operation of the tram road
The tram road is reminiscent of transport systems such as the Cambridgeshire Guided Busway where dedicated busways have gaps for roads to cross and also sections of normal road that may lead on to other sections of guided busway. The Towerlands tram road had several places where short 'gaps' existed which presumably had no rails or plates, a gap at a 'T' junction, and near Irvine the route even crossed from one side of the road to the other without any physical connection of the 'permanent way'. If the coal was transported in waggons or trams with no flanges, then such gaps would not be a real problem, just an inconvenience.

The routes

The tram road was divided into a section that ran from the Towerlands Colliery to the outskirts of Irvine and a short separate section that ran from sidings and a turn-round loop at the colliery to sidings at Dreghorn Station, running past the old Broomlands miners rows along the Station Brae Road without any 'breaks', suggesting that it was more of a standard railway than the tram road that ran to Irvine. The line joined the sidings at a right angle, indicating that a small turntable was used.

The route towards Irvine ran through fields with two right-angle turns until it reached the road near Towerlands House, where it ran along the side of the road with a gap or 'break' opposite the lane that divided Towerlands estate from the old Bourtreehill estate and further along a break at the 'T' junction near Fencedyke on the road that leads to Irvine via Mill Lane. After the 'T' junction at Fencedyke, the tram road is shown to 'break' and cross to the other side of Mill Road at the municipal boundary. In 1836 the Irvine Town Council had installed a steam engine at the Town Mill and coal may have been delivered here. The tram road stopped just short of the old toll at Irvine's Townhead near the site of Springfield House.

The tramroad and colliery today
Nothing survives of the colliery, associated spoil heaps and old offices. A housing estate now occupies the site. The tram road's route survives in part, and the sections running into Irvine and Dreghorn are occupied by the Broomlands Busway that joins Mill Road.

Micro-history
In 1862, 25-year-old Alexander Crawford from Towerlands Colliery won the first prize in Glasgow School of Mines And The Society of Arts' Examinations in mining and metallurgy for the Society of Arts' prizes and certificates. Prior to a six-month period of study he was maintaining his wife and family by hewing coals. His only previous period of formal education was twelve months at a village school.

The tram road had a lot in common with the Craigie Waggonway that carried coal from the Craigie Pits to Ayr between 1855 and 1865.

See also

 Haytor Granite Tramway
 Ravenscraig and Jameston Railway
 Stevenston Canal

References
Notes

References
 Johnson, William (1828). Map of Ayrshire from Estate Plans by William Johnson, Land Surveyor.
 Strawhorn, John (1985). The History of Irvine. Royal Burgh and Town. Edinburgh : John Donald. .

External links

 Commentary and video on the Towerlands Colliery Tram Road

Geography of North Ayrshire
Quarries in Scotland
Transport in Scotland
Horse-drawn railways
Railway lines closed in 1878
Irvine, North Ayrshire